Soodla Reservoir is located on Soodla river in Pillapalu Village, Anija Parish, Harju County, Estonia, near Kehra and Kuusalu.

The reservoir is part of the Tallinn water supply system and feeds Jägala, Aavoja and Pirita rivers with water through Raudoja Reservoir.

History 
Plans to build the reservoir date back to 1975. The reservoir was built and flooded in 1981.

See also 
Raudoja Reservoir
Aavoja Reservoir
Kaunissaare Reservoir
Paunküla Reservoir
Vaskjala Reservoir
Lake Ülemiste
List of lakes of Estonia

References

Anija Parish
Reservoirs in Estonia
Lakes of Harju County